Richard A. Johnson is an artist and retired professor in the Fine Arts department at the University of New Orleans. He was a recipient of the Rome Prize in the category of Visual Arts in 1968 .

External links
 Profile of Richard A. Johnson

Living people
Year of birth missing (living people)
20th-century American male artists
University of New Orleans faculty
Place of birth missing (living people)